Luis Villalobos (November 5, 1938 – October 1, 2009) was an engineer, entrepreneur and angel investor credited with
founding the angel investing organization Tech Coast Angels in 1997.

As an engineer and entrepreneur, Villalobos founded two companies and as an angel investor, invested in over 50 ventures.

In 2006 Luis was the recipient of the Hans Severiens Award

for his accomplishments in the advancement of angel investing.

The Paul Merage School of Business at the University of California, Irvine has established an endowed fellowship fund (the Luis Villalobos Endowed Fellowship in Entrepreneurship) in honor of Luis Villalobos' contributions to entrepreneurship.
  
Villalobos was a graduate of MIT and the Harvard Business School.

References

1938 births
2009 deaths
20th-century American engineers
Place of birth missing
American investors
Harvard Business School alumni
Massachusetts Institute of Technology alumni